Jasmine Anteunis is a French entrepreneur who co-founded Recast.AI.

Biography

Education 
Anteunis first studied arts at the Institut Supérieur des Arts Appliqués and Ecole Supérieure d'Art d'Aix-en-Provence before joining the first edition of 42.

Career 
At the end of her training at 42, Anteunis launched a startup called Recast.AI with co-founders Julien Blancher, Paul Renvoisé, and Patrick Joubert. In June 2016, Recast.AI raised 2 million euros from business angels, including Kima Ventures, a fund managed by Xavier Niel. The startup was bought by SAP in March 2018.

Recognitions 
Anteunis was named by Forbes as one of Europe's 50 Top Women in Tech in 2018.

References

External links 
 
 
 Jasmine Anteunis on GitHub

Year of birth missing (living people)
Living people
French businesspeople